CBS Tramore was a secondary school located in Tramore, Co. Waterford, Ireland. It catered for students studying for the Irish Junior and Leaving Certificate. Since 2007, it also catered for LCA students. The school closed in June, 2014 and amalgamated with Stella Maris to form a new school, Ardscoil Na Mara.

External links 
School website

Secondary schools in County Waterford
Defunct Catholic schools in Ireland
2014 disestablishments in Ireland
Educational institutions disestablished in 2014